Jules François Toutain (20 November 1865, Vincennes – 18 January 1961, Paris) was a French archeologist.

The son of the professor Henri Toutain, he studied at the Lycée Charlemagne before entering the École Normale Supérieure in 1885.

A professor at the École Normale Supérieure, Toutain was president of the Academy of Sciences in Semur and director of excavations in Alésia until 1958. In addition to the excavations at Alésia, his research was on the history of Roman Africa, in particular on the area of modern-day Tunisia, and on the history of religions in the Roman Empire, in which he opposed the theories of Franz Cumont.

Toutain died at the age of 95, in his apartment on the Rue du Four in the 6th arrondissement of Paris.

Publications 
 Histoire contemporaine jusqu'au milieu du XIXeme siecle, 1929
 Histoire de l'antiquité, 1911
 Histoire du Moyen Âge, 1911
 Histoire moderne, 1913
 Histoire de France et histoire générale de 1789 à nos jours, 1910
 L'Idée religieuse de la rédemption et l'un de ses principaux rites dans l'antiquité grecque et romaine, 1916
 L'Économie antique, 1927 (Collection L'Évolution de l'humanité)
 La Gaule antique vue dans Alésia, 1932
 Les Cultes païens dans l'Empire romain, 1917–1920
 Les Northmans en Islande au Moyen Âge, 1898
 La Légende de la déesse phrygienne Cybèle, ses transformations, 1909
 Alésia. Son histoire, sa résurrection, 1912
 Histoire de l'Europe et particulièrement de la France depuis la fin du V° siècle jusqu'à la guerre de Cent ans, 1925
 Les Origines historiques de la Société des Nations..., 1925
 Chronique des fouilles : la campagne de 1924... rapport adressé à M. le Ministre de l'instruction publique et des beaux-arts par M. J. Toutain..., 1926
 Un Grand héros national : Vercingétorix, 1934
 À la recherche d'Alésia, Alaise ou Alise ?, 1952
 Les cités romaines de la Tunisie : Essai sur l'histoire de la Colonisation romaine dans l'Afrique du Nord, 1895
 Discours prononcés à la séance de clôture du Congrès le samedi 23 avril 1927 / par M. Jules Toutain et M. Edouard Herriot, Congrès des Sociétés savantes à Paris, 1928
 Note sur les puits découverts à Alesia en 1909, 1911
 Notes d'épigraphie et d'archéologie tunisienne, 1907, Bulletin archéologique
 Histoire de l'Orient et de la Grèce, 1923
 Comment s'est formée dès l'Antiquité la nationalité française, 1936

References

External links 
 Robert Schilling, Nécrologie : Jules Toutain (1865–1961), École pratique des hautes études, Section des sciences religieuses, Annuaire 1961–1962, 1960, .

19th-century French archaeologists
20th-century French archaeologists
People from Vincennes
1865 births
1961 deaths
École Normale Supérieure alumni
French classical scholars
20th-century French historians